is a former-professional Japanese cyclist, who last rode for UCI Continental team .

Major results

2007
 1st Road race, Junior Asian Games
 1st Stage 5 Tour de l'Abitibi
2008
 1st Stage 3 Tour of Iran
2009
 1st Team time trial, East Asian Games (with Makoto Iijima, Kazuo Inoue and Kazuhiro Mori)
2010
 6th Overall Tour de Okinawa
2011
 1st  Time trial, National Under-23 Road Championships
2012
 3rd Grand prix de Ben Guerir, Challenge des phosphates
2013
 1st Stage 7 Tour de Taiwan
2015
 4th Road race, National Under-23 Road Championships

References

External links

1989 births
Living people
Japanese male cyclists
Sportspeople from Nara Prefecture